The 1963 BYU Cougars football team represented Brigham Young University (BYU) as a member of the Western Athletic Conference (WAC) during the 1963 NCAA University Division football season. In their third and final season under head coach Hal Mitchell, the Cougars compiled an overall record of 2–8 with a mark of 0–4 against conference opponents, finished last out of sixth place in the WAC, and were outscored by a combined total of 222 to 91.

The team's statistical leaders included Phil Brady with 318 rushing yards and 448 yards of total offense, Ron Stewart with 160 passing yards, Bruce Smith with 178 receiving yards, and Frank Baker with 23 points scored.

Schedule

References

BYU
BYU Cougars football seasons
BYU Cougars football